Sultan Muhammad Shams ud-din Iskandar II was the Sultan of the Maldives from 1773 to 1774. His father was Husain Bodu Dorimena Kilegefan. He usurped the throne from the Dhiyamigili Dynasty on 22 December 1773. He abdicated in 1774 and was succeeded by Sultan Muhammad Mu'iz ud-din Iskander ibni al-Marhum Shah Ghazi al-Hasan 'Izz ud-din.He started building the Kalhuvakaru Mosque in 1774.

18th-century sultans of the Maldives